is a novelist and mystery writer from Shizuoka Prefecture, Japan. He is a graduate of Shizuoka University, where he studied science and math. In 1998, his debut work J no shinwa won the 4th Mephisto Prize. His work is distinguished by its slightly warped style. His most important work is Initiation Love.

List of works
 J no shinwa
 Hako no naka
 Tō no danshō
 Marionette shōkōgun
 Hayashi shinkurō to itsutsu no nazo
 Initiation Love
 Repeat

References 

1963 births
20th-century Japanese novelists
21st-century Japanese novelists
Japanese mystery writers
Living people